101 Strings Orchestra was a brand for a highly successful easy listening symphonic music organization, with a discography exceeding 150 albums and a creative lifetime of around 30 years beginning in 1957. 101 Strings had a trademark sound, focusing on melody with a laid-back ambiance most often featuring strings. Their LPs were individualized by the slogan "The Sound of Magnificence", a puffy cloud logo and sepia-toned photo of the orchestra. The 101 Strings orchestra included 124 string instruments, and was conducted by Wilhelm Stephan. The orchestra's famous official photograph was taken in the Musikhalle Hamburg.

History

Miller and rock and roll
Record label mogul David L. Miller came to prominence by releasing the first Bill Haley & His Comets’ records in 1952–1953 on his own Essex label (followed by Trans-World, then Somerset Records). In this capacity, Miller played a role in the creation of rock and roll.

Miller and 101 Strings
Following the rise of mood music (practitioners of which included Mantovani and Jackie Gleason Presents), Miller subcontracted the Orchester des Nordwestdeutschen Rundfunks Hamburg (the Northwest German Radio Orchestra of Hamburg) conducted by Wilhelm Stephan to play in-house arrangements of popular standards. The first three 101 Strings albums were released in November 1957, and twelve more titles were released in 1958 (many of which featured recycled material from earlier albums attributed to the New World Orchestra, Rio Carnival Orchestra, and other light music orchestras). These records were pressed by Miller's own plants and released through his own distribution channels (such as grocery stores).

His core staff arrangers were Monty Kelly, Joseph Francis Kuhn, and Robert Lowden. All three proved adept at writing original compositions that were stylistically consistent both with contemporary hit songs and each other. Miller placed these on 101 Strings albums to provide additional publishing revenues.

Kelly's earliest successes were Latin and Spanish travelogues (such as the "Soul of Spain" series), although he became 101 Strings' "Now Sound" specialist following the British Invasion. Kuhn concentrated on radio-friendly numbers in the "Pops"'s orchestral manner ("Blues Pizzicato", etc.) which provided Somerset its initial catalog of originals. Lowden composed lounge ballads (such as "Blue Twilight"). Their body of early 1960s work, including recordings under the names of the Cinema Sound Stage Orchestra and the Zero Zero Seven Band, was recycled via re-release throughout the next twenty years.

Sherman and 101 Strings
In 1964, Miller sold the franchise to Al Sherman, a successful record label distributor, who renamed the label Alshire (based in Los Angeles) and moved recording to London. Sherman retained Miller as a partner to oversee production and A&R. The Alshire era is characterized by large-scale expansion of product, attempts to branch out to younger markets and beginning in 1969, eventual stagnation (although late efforts by Les Baxter and Nelson Riddle were released under the 101 name in 1970's). Output decreased from 1974 on. A tribute to John Lennon (composed of earlier Beatle tribute material – 101 Strings play Hits written by The Beatles) in January 1981 marked the final 101 Strings effort.

Many 101 Strings albums are simply orchestrated versions of pop hits and show tunes, although the early Somerset material contains many examples of the exotica and lounge genres. East of Suez (1959), In a Hawaiian Paradise  (1960), and Songs of the Seasons in Japan (1964) are three such albums. 101 Strings Play the Blues	(1958) and Back Beat Symphony were early experiments in symphonic-pop hybridization, while Fly Me to the Moon (1961) contains five noir-ish originals. Alshire releases include ‘Now Sound’ albums such as The Sounds and Songs of the Jet Set (1965), Sounds of Today (1967), and Astro-Sounds from Beyond the Year 2000  (1969), the last of which has been frequently sampled by electronic music artists of the 1990s and 2000s (decade).

Current Ownership
The current owner is Countdown Media (a subsidiary of BMG Rights Management).

Sales
In the 24 years of their existence, 101 Strings sold over 50,000,000 records worldwide.

Chart hits
The orchestra had five hit albums in the UK, including one number one.
 Gypsy Campfires (1958) #9
 The Soul of Spain (1958) #17
  Ferde Grofe's Grand Canyon Suite (1958) #10
 Down Drury Lane to Memory Lane (1960) #1
 Morning Noon and Night #32

Discography

 101 Strings in a Hawaiian Paradise (1960)
 101 Strings in a Symphony for Lovers
 101 Strings Play and Sing the Songs Made Famous by Olivia Newton-John
 101 Strings Play Songs of Faith
 101 Strings Play the Blues (1958)
 101 Strings Play the Hit Songs from Rodgers and Hart "Pal Joey" and Victor Herbert's "The Red Mill"
 101 Strings Play the Sugar & Spice of Rudolph Friml
 101 Strings Play the World's Great Standards
 101 Strings Play Victor Herbert Favorites
 Award Winning Scores from the Silver Screen
 Back Beat Symphony
 A Bridal Bouquet The World's Most Beautiful Wedding Songs
 Broadway Cocktail Party
 Camelot
 Cole Porter (1965)
 Concerto Under the Stars
 Dynamic Percussion
 East of Suez (1959)
 The Emotion of 101 Strings at Gypsy Campfires (1958)
 Exodus and Other Great Movie Themes
 Fire and Romance of South America
 Fly Me to the Moon (1961)
 The Glory of Christmas
 The Golden Age of the Romantics
 Great Composers – Romantic Favorites
 Hit American Waltzes
 Hit Songs from Hit Movies
 Duke Ellington and Hoagy Carmichael (1972)
 I Left My Heart in San Francisco
 I Love Paris
 Italian Hits (1961)
 A Mediterranean Cruise to the Rivieras – Spain, France, and Italy
 Million Seller Hits Composed by Jim Webb and Burt Bacharach
 Million Seller Hits from the Golden Age of the Dance Band
 Million Seller Hit Songs of the 30s
 Million Seller Hits of the 40s
 Million Seller Hits of the 50s
 Million Seller Hits of 1966
 A Night in Vienna
 A Night in the Tropics
 A Night Serenade in the Quiet Hours
 Piano Concertos and Rhapsodies
 Porgy and Bess (1959)
 Rhapsody
 Richard Rodgers Oscar Hammerstein (1966)
 The Sound of Henry Mancini (1972)
 The Romantic Melodies of Victor Herbert
 A Romantic Mood for Dining and Dreaming
 Russian Fireworks
 S.R.O – Standing Room Only – Broadway Hits
 Songs for Inspiration and Meditation
 Songs from George M. – Cohan, That Is – And New York, The Good Old Days
 Songs of Hank Williams and Other Country Greats
 The Soul of Mexico (1962)
 Soul of Music U.S.A. (1958)
 The Soul of Spain (1958)
 The Soul of Spain, Volume 2 (1958)
 The Sounds and Songs of the Jet Set (1965)
 Themes from Superman and Other Great Themes from Space" (1979)
 Hits Made Famous by the Supremes The Tijuana Sound Concertos U.S.A. Astro-Sounds from Beyond the Year 2000 (1969)
 Nelson Riddle Conducts the 101 Strings (1970)
 The 'Exotic' Sounds of Love (1970)
 San Francisco – City of Romance (1974)
 T.V. Themes (1975)
 Movie Themes, Arrangements by Les Baxter (1975)
 Twenty-Five Years of Show Hits The Soul of Spain, Volume 3 (1971)
 101 Strings play the World's Great Standards An Evening of Pops Concert Favorites A Night Serenade in the Quiet Hours Hawaiian Paradise Million-Seller Hit Songs of the 40s Ravel: Bolero Soul of the Blues (1960)
 Concertos for Lovers Swingin' Things from 101 Strings 101 Strings Plays Hit Songs for Girls After a Hard Day – Music to Relax By Love is Blue (L'Amour Est Bleu) 101 Strings Play Million Seller Hits 101 Strings Play Million Seller Hits – Volume 1 (1967)
 101 Strings Play Million Seller Hits – Volume 2 (1967)
 101 Strings Play Million Seller Hits – Volume 3 101 Strings Play Million Seller Hits – Volume 4 (1972)
 Million Seller Hits (1971)
 101 Strings with Twin Pianos – Million Seller Hits (1968)
 Million Seller Hits of Today (1968)
 101 Strings Play Million Seller Hits of Today (1969)
 More Million Seller Hits of Today (1971)
 Lullabies for Baby 101 Strings with Romantic Piano at Cocktail Time 101 Strings play Romantic Songs of the Sea 101 Strings plus Guitars Galore – Volume 2 101 Strings plus Trumpet (1969)
 101 Strings play Hits written by The Beatles (1981)
 101 Strings play Million Seller Hits of Today written by Simon and Garfunkel Come Sail with Me Gold Award Hits Greatest Hits of Ray Charles (1970)
 The Many Moods of 101 Strings [this Bonus LP1-A was "not for sale."]
 Songs of Carole King (1972)
 African Safari – The Activity and Excitement of an Actual Big Game Hunt! The Magnificent Waltz – 101 Strings Orchestra (1972)
 Solid Gold Vol. 1 – 101 Strings (cassette-1983 Alshire ALSC-5393)
 Play Polkas (1972)
 101 Strings – Tribute to Hank Williams Hank Williams & Other Country Greats (1972)
 Rhapsody and Blue (1993)
 ‘’101 strings plus one’’ (1969)
 ‘’101 strings plays Songs of England (1970)

Films
The music of the 101 Strings Orchestra was prominently featured throughout the film Easy Listening'' (2002).

References

External links 
 101 Strings biography by Steve Huey, discography and album reviews, credits & releases at AllMusic
 101 Strings discography, album releases & credits at Discogs
 101 Strings discography and album reviews & ratings by users at Rate Your Music
 101 Strings Orchestra albums to be listened as stream on Spotify

1957 establishments in West Germany
1981 disestablishments in West Germany
Disbanded orchestras
Easy listening musicians
German orchestras
Madacy Entertainment artists
Musical groups established in 1957
Musical groups disestablished in 1981
Musical groups from Hamburg
Pops orchestras
Sound-alike musical groups